Nationality words link to articles with information on the nation's poetry or literature (for instance, Irish or France).

Works published
 Sir John Beaumont, Bosworth-field: With a taste of the variety of other poems left by Sir John Beaumont, posthumously published by his son and namesake
 George Chapman, translator, A Justification of a Strange Action of Nero, Part 2 is a verse translation of Juvenal's Book 1, Satire 5
 Thomas Farnaby, editor,  (later editions in 1650, 1671)
 Sir Francis Hubert, The Historie of Edward the Second Surnamed Carnarvan, the authorized edition; unauthorized edition published in 1628
 Thomas May, translation, Selected Epigrams of Martial
 Francis Quarles, Argalus and Parthenia

Births
Death years link to the corresponding "[year] in poetry" article:
 Katherine Austen (died 1683), English diarist and poet
 Laurens Bake (died 1702), Dutch poet
 Zhu Yizun (died 1709), Chinese poet
 December 12 – Symeon of Polotsk (died 1680), Baroque Belarusian-Russian poet, dramatist, churchman, and enlightener

Deaths
Birth years link to the corresponding "[year] in poetry" article:
 August 18 – Vendela Skytte (born 1608), Swedish noblewoman, salon hostess, writer and poet
 November – Robert Hayman (born 1575), English poet and governor of Newfoundland
 May 5 – Szymon Szymonowic (born 1558), Polish humanist, poet and playwright, called "the Polish Pindar"
 date not known – Gerolamo Aleandro (born 1574), Italian, Latin-language poet

See also

 Poetry
 17th century in poetry
 17th century in literature

Notes

17th-century poetry
Poetry